is one of the Public junior Colleges in Japan. It was located at Owariasahi, Aichi. It was opened at 1953， abolished in 1997.

Department and Graduate Course

Departments 
 Department of Child care
 Department of Primary education

Advanced course 
 No

External Relations 
 Nagoya City University

Japanese junior colleges
Public universities in Japan